This is a list of avant-garde and experimental films released in the 2010s.

References 

2010's
Avant-garde